Shackleton is a British period television drama series which aired in four parts on BBC 2 in 1983. It portrays the Antarctic expeditions of the explorer Sir Ernest Shackleton. Scriptwriter Christopher Ralling drew on Shackleton's own journals, which were re-published by the BBC as a tie-in to the series.

Cast
 David Schofield as Sir Ernest Shackleton
 David Rodigan as  Frank Wild
 Michael Hayward as 'Putty' Marston
 Robert Lang as Major Darwin
 Robert James as  Sir John Scott-Keltie
 Victoria Fairbrother as  Emily Shackleton 
 Neil Stacy as Captain R. F. Scott
 Geoffrey Chater as Sir Clements Markham
 Anthony Bate as Lord Curzon
 Benjamin Whitrow as  Roald Amundsen
 Michael Sheard as Dr. Koettlitz
 Kevin Whately as Jameson Adams
 Leslie Schofield as Ernie Joyce
 Tara Hiatt as Small Child

See also
 The Last Place on Earth

References

Bibliography
Ellen Baskin. Serials on British Television, 1950-1994. Scolar Press, 1996.
 Neville Peat. Shackleton's Whisky: A Spirit of Discovery: Ernest Shackleton's 1907 Antarctic Expedition, and the Rare Malt Whisky He Left Behind. Penguin Random House, 2012.

External links
 

BBC television dramas
1983 British television series debuts
1983 British television series endings
English-language television shows